Andrew or Andy Ellis may refer to the following notable people:
Andrew Ellis (businessman), English businessman and former chairman of Northampton Town F.C.
Andrew Ellis (cricketer) (born 1982), New Zealand cricketer
Andy Ellis (rugby union) (born 1984), New Zealand rugby union player
Andy Ellis (rugby league) (born 1984), English rugby league player
Andrew Ellis (badminton) (born 1987), badminton player from England
Andrew Ellis (surgeon) (1792–1867), president of the Royal College of Surgeons in Ireland
Andrew Ellis (actor) (born 1990), English actor best known for his role as Gary "Gadget" Flowers in This Is England
Andy Ellis (basketball) (born 1980), American basketball player previously active in the Japanese bj league
Andy Ellis (bassist), bassist of American metal band ASG
Andy Ellis, guitarist of the band Black Lab